The Debt Collector is a 1999 thriller, written and directed by Scottish dramatist Anthony Neilson and starring Billy Connolly, Ken Stott and Francesca Annis.

Loosely based on the character of Jimmy Boyle, The Debt Collector explores themes of forgiveness, revenge, change and the macho culture of modern urban Scottish life.

Plot
The film opens in late 1970s Edinburgh; Nicky Dryden (Billy Connolly) is arrested by Gary Keltie (Ken Stott) for his part in enforcing the collection of money owed to a loan shark.

Soon the film moves into the present time. Dryden has left prison and changed his ways. He is now a feted sculptor married to journalist Val Dryden (Francesca Annis) displaying his first show. The show is interrupted by Keltie who is disgusted by Dryden's new-found respectability, and claims that he hasn't paid his debt to society. Dryden wishes to move on from his past crimes, but Keltie is determined not to let him forget his past. Val is disturbed when Dryden confesses to her that his "policy" (modus operandi) during his criminal days was to intimidate debtors by assaulting their close relatives.

At the same time a young wannabe gangster Flipper (Iain Robertson) is obsessed by Dryden's dark past and wishes to emulate him. He takes part in low level crime, which escalates in a murder of a security guard at a swimming pool (played by Ford Kiernan).

Keltie continues to harass Dryden and his family, including disrupting a family wedding. When Dryden's stepson is murdered and Keltie shows up at the funeral, Dryden seeks revenge. He contacts one of his old underworld colleagues who arranges for Flipper to attack Keltie. Flipper, however, imitates Dryden's "policy" by viciously attacking Keltie's elderly mother (played by Annette Crosbie). Flipper makes contact with Dryden and boasts about his crime to Dryden. Disgusted by the attack on an old woman, Dryden himself brutally attacks Flipper, killing him in the end.

Extremely distraught over the attack upon his mother, Keltie breaks into Dryden's home to attack Dryden. Dryden is however at the Edinburgh Tattoo at the time, and Keltie instead takes his vengeance on Dryden by raping his wife.

Keltie eventually meets up with Dryden, and in a fight outside Edinburgh Castle ends up being killed by Dryden.

The film ends with Dryden being acquitted of the murder of Keltie, but he is a broken man, disabled by the attack, his marriage has broken up and he is once again estranged from polite society. Finally, Keltie's mother is placed in a nursing home to reflect on the loss she has endured.

Filming locations
Although predominantly set in Edinburgh, much of the film was filmed in Glasgow as part of the condition of the Glasgow Film Fund. and some shot in Edinburgh.

Cast
Billy Connolly - Nickie Dryden
Ken Stott - Gary Keltie  
Francesca Annis - Val Dryden                  
Iain Robertson - Flipper  
Annette Crosbie - Lana Keltie 
Alastair Galbraith - Colquhoun 
Shauna Macdonald - Catriona
Sandy Neilson - Duncan
Jimmy Logan - Mr. Dryden 
Ronni Ancona - Miss Dryden
Ford Kiernan - Janitor

Awards 
The film won the FIPRESCI prize at the Troia Film Festival.

References

External links
 
 
 

1999 films
Scottish films
Films set in Scotland
Films set in Edinburgh
Culture in Glasgow
Films shot in Edinburgh
Films produced by Graham Broadbent
English-language Scottish films
1990s English-language films